The Lady Fare or Lady Fare is a 1929 American short comedy film directed by William Watson, from a story by Octavus Roy Cohen, and screenplay by Spencer Williams. It was produced by Al Christie and filmed by the Christie Film Company.

The film was one of the first African American talking movies, described as a "singie" and a "dancie". It featured an all-female chorus line, possibly inspired by the Cotton Club. The 20-minute film premiered on September 28, 1929.

Cast
Herbert V. Skinner
Leroy Broomfield
Claude Collins
Vernon Elkins
Aurora Greeley
Leon Hereford
Roberta Hyson
Gus Jones
Evelyn Preer
Junie Rutledge
Zack Williams
Spencer Williams Jr.
Edward Thompson

References

External links 
 

1929 comedy films
1929 short films
African-American musical comedy films